Carrascal may refer to the following places:

 Carrascal, municipality in the Philippines
 Carrascal de Barregas, village in Spain
 Carrascal del Río, municipality in Spain
 Carrascal del Obispo, village in Spain

See also 
 Carrascalejo, municipality in Spain